Stepkovo is a rural locality (a village) in Karinskoye Rural Settlement, Alexandrovsky District, Vladimir Oblast, Russia. The population was 116 as of 2010. There are 4 streets.

Geography 
Stepkovo is located on the Seraya River, 13 km south of Alexandrov (the district's administrative centre) by road. Karabanovo is the nearest rural locality.

References 

Rural localities in Alexandrovsky District, Vladimir Oblast